William Ferguson Miller MBE (born 2 May 1955) is a Scottish former professional football player and manager, who made a club record 560 league appearances for Aberdeen. Sir Alex Ferguson described Miller as "the best penalty box defender in the world".

Club career
Born in Glasgow, Miller was raised in the Bridgeton area of Glasgow. He had little interest in football as a young child, and when he did become drawn to the game he played initially as a goalkeeper. He was scouted by several professional clubs while playing as a forward with Glasgow Schools and Eastercraigs Boys Club.

Having been on unofficial schoolboy terms in 1969, Miller signed full-time for Aberdeen in 1971 at the age of 16 and spent a season on loan with Peterhead in the Highland League, scoring 24 goals; upon his return he was converted to a central defender/sweeper in the reserves on the advice of Teddy Scott, established himself in that position in the first team in place of Henning Boel, and by 1975 had been made captain by manager Ally MacLeod.

Miller's central defensive partnership with Alex McLeish was integral to Aberdeen's success in the 1980s, as they won all the major domestic honours and the European Cup Winners' Cup in 1983. He made at least 40 appearances for Aberdeen in 14 consecutive seasons, amassing a total of 12 trophies won as well as appearing in several other finals. His total of 797 competitive appearances for the club is comfortably (by more than 100 matches) the all-time record.

He retired from playing in 1990 due to an injury picked up whilst playing for Scotland. A farewell testimonial match in his honour took place in December 1990 with Aberdeen facing a 'World Cup XI' (featuring Kenny Dalglish, David O'Leary, Mark Hughes and Danny McGrain among others) at Pittodrie Stadium. He had already received a testimonial in 1981 against Tottenham Hotspur.

In 2003, Willie Miller was voted the greatest Aberdeen player of all time in a poll to mark the club's centenary. In 2015 it was no surprise when he was named in Aberdeen's 'greatest ever team' by supporters of the club.

International career
Having appeared at under-21 and under-23 level, Miller won 65 full international caps for Scotland between 1975 and 1989, scoring one goal. His 50th cap came against West Germany during the 1986 FIFA World Cup. His international career was effectively ended by an injury suffered during the last game of 1990 FIFA World Cup qualification. Although he did not play in the 1990 FIFA World Cup finals, Miller was presented with the match ball from Scotland's 1–0 loss to Brazil to thank him for his contribution to Scottish football.

He was an inaugural inductee to the Scottish Football Hall of Fame in 2004, and is also on the international roll of honour, having won 50 international caps. In 2010, Miller was chosen as one of the eleven members of Scotland's Greatest Team, by viewers of the Scottish Television documentary series, which sought the fans' opinion on the best Scotland players since the 1960s. Viewers also chose Alex McLeish as his partner in central defence.

Managerial career
In February 1992, he was appointed Aberdeen manager, replacing the sacked Alex Smith. Despite two second-place finishes in the league and two losing cup finals in 1992–93, Miller was sacked in February 1995 with the club in danger of being relegated for the first time in its history (survival was eventually achieved via a playoff).

In May 2004, Miller was appointed to the Aberdeen board and given executive responsibility for football. He played a large role in the appointment of Jimmy Calderwood (a friend from their Glasgow Schools days) as manager, as well as progressing the club's youth academy.

In June 2011, he was appointed as Aberdeen's Director of Football Development, with the responsibility of finding new playing talent for the club. He departed again in 2012.

Career outside football
Miller has worked for the BBC, particularly for Radio Scotland, as a football commentator and analyst. He has written two autobiographies, The Miller's Tale and The Don, the latter being published in 2007. His third book, Willie Miller's Aberdeen Dream Team, was published in 2011.

During the 2014 Scottish independence referendum Miller was a supporter of the Better Together campaign against Scottish independence.

Career statistics

Club

International

Scores and results list Scotland's goal tally first, score column indicates score after each Miller goal.

Managerial record

Honours

Player
 Scottish Premier Division: 1979–80, 1983–84, 1984–85
 Scottish Cup: 1981–82, 1982–83, 1983–84, 1985–86; finalist 1977–78
 Scottish League Cup: 1976–77, 1985–86, 1989–90;  finalist four times
 European Cup Winners' Cup: 1982–83
 European Super Cup: 1983

Manager
 Scottish Cup: runner-up 1992–93
 Scottish League Cup: runner-up 1992–93
 Aberdeenshire Cup: 1992–93

Individual
 PFA Scotland Players' Player of the Year: 1984
 SFWA Footballer of the Year: 1984
 Scotland national football team roll of honour: 1986
 Scottish Football Hall of Fame: 2004

See also
 List of footballers in Scotland by number of league appearances (500+)
 List of one-club men in association football
 List of Scotland national football team captains

References

External links
 
 
 Hall Of Fame profile at AFC Heritage Trust
 Manager profile at AFC Heritage Trust
 Scottish Football Hall of Fame profile

1955 births
Aberdeen F.C. players
Aberdeen F.C. managers
1982 FIFA World Cup players
1986 FIFA World Cup players
Association football central defenders
Living people
Highland Football League players
Peterhead F.C. players
Members of the Order of the British Empire
Footballers from Glasgow
People from Bridgeton, Glasgow
Scottish Football League players
Scottish football managers
Scottish footballers
Scotland international footballers
Aberdeen F.C. non-playing staff
Scottish Football Hall of Fame inductees
Scottish Football League representative players
Scotland under-21 international footballers
Scotland under-23 international footballers
Scottish Football League managers
Scottish radio personalities